In probability theory and statistics, the marginal distribution of a subset of a collection of random variables is the probability distribution of the variables contained in the subset. It gives the probabilities of various values of the variables in the subset without reference to the values of the other variables. This contrasts with a conditional distribution, which gives the probabilities contingent upon the values of the other variables.

Marginal variables are those variables in the subset of variables being retained. These concepts are "marginal" because they can be found by summing values in a table along rows or columns, and writing the sum in the margins of the table. The distribution of the marginal variables (the marginal distribution) is obtained by marginalizing (that is, focusing on the sums in the margin) over the distribution of the variables being discarded, and the discarded variables are said to have been marginalized out.

The context here is that the theoretical studies being undertaken, or the data analysis being done, involves a wider set of random variables but that attention is being limited to a reduced number of those variables. In many applications, an analysis may start with a given collection of random variables, then first extend the set by defining new ones (such as the sum of the original random variables) and finally reduce the number by placing interest in the marginal distribution of a subset (such as the sum). Several different analyses may be done, each treating a different subset of variables as the marginal distribution.

Definition

Marginal probability mass function 

, and 

A marginal probability can always be written as an expected value:

Intuitively, the marginal probability of X  is computed by examining the conditional probability of X given a particular value of Y, and then averaging this conditional probability over the distribution of all values of Y.

This follows from the definition of expected value (after applying the law of the unconscious statistician)

Therefore, marginalization provides the rule for the transformation of the probability distribution of a random variable Y and another random variable :

Marginal probability density function 
Given two continuous random variables X and Y whose joint distribution is known, then the marginal probability density function can be obtained by integrating the joint probability distribution, over Y, and vice versa. That is

   

Marginal cumulative distribution function 
Finding the marginal cumulative distribution function from the joint cumulative distribution function is easy. Recall that:

 For discrete random variables, 
 For continuous random variables, 

If X and Y jointly take values on [a, b] × [c, d] then

 and 

If d is ∞, then this becomes a limit .

Marginal distribution vs. conditional distribution

Definition 
The marginal probability is the probability of a single event occurring, independent of other events. A conditional probability, on the other hand, is the probability that an event occurs given that another specific event has already occurred. This means that the calculation for one variable is dependent on another variable.

The conditional distribution of a variable given another variable is the joint distribution of both variables divided by the marginal distribution of the other variable. That is,

 For discrete random variables,
 For continuous random variables,

Example 
Suppose there is data from a classroom of 200 students on the amount of time studied (X) and the percentage of correct answers (Y). Assuming that X and Y are discrete random variables, the joint distribution of X and Y can be described by listing all the possible values of p(xi,yj), as shown in Table.3.

The marginal distribution can be used to determine how many students scored 20 or below: , meaning 10 students or 5%.

The conditional distribution can be used to determine the probability that a student that studied 60 minutes or more obtains a scored of 20 or below: , meaning there is about a 11% probability of scoring 20 after having studied for at least 60 minutes.

Real-world example
Suppose that the probability that a pedestrian will be hit by a car, while crossing the road at a pedestrian crossing, without paying attention to the traffic light, is to be computed. Let H be a discrete random variable taking one value from {Hit, Not Hit}. Let L (for traffic light) be a discrete random variable taking one value from {Red, Yellow, Green}.

Realistically, H will be dependent on L. That is, P(H = Hit) will take different values depending on whether L is red, yellow or green (and likewise for P(H = Not Hit)). A person is, for example, far more likely to be hit by a car when trying to cross while the lights for perpendicular traffic are green than if they are red. In other words, for any given possible pair of values for H and L, one must consider the joint probability distribution of H and L to find the probability of that pair of events occurring together if the pedestrian ignores the state of the light.

However, in trying to calculate the marginal probability P(H = Hit), what is being sought is the probability that H = Hit in the situation in which the particular value of L is unknown and in which the pedestrian ignores the state of the light. In general, a pedestrian can be hit if the lights are red OR if the lights are yellow OR if the lights are green. So, the answer for the marginal probability can be found by summing P(H | L) for all possible values of L, with each value of L weighted by its probability of occurring.

Here is a table showing the conditional probabilities of being hit, depending on the state of the lights. (Note that the columns in this table must add up to 1 because the probability of being hit or not hit is 1 regardless of the state of the light.)

To find the joint probability distribution, more data is required. For example, suppose P(L = red) = 0.2, P(L = yellow) = 0.1, and P(L = green) = 0.7. Multiplying each column in the conditional distribution by the probability of that column occurring results in the joint probability distribution of H and L, given in the central 2×3 block of entries. (Note that the cells in this 2×3 block add up to 1).

The marginal probability P(H = Hit) is the sum 0.572 along the H = Hit row of this joint distribution table, as this is the probability of being hit when the lights are red OR yellow OR green. Similarly, the marginal probability that P(H = Not Hit) is the sum along the H = Not Hit row.

Multivariate distributions

For multivariate distributions, formulae similar to those above apply with the symbols X and/or Y being interpreted as vectors. In particular, each summation or integration would be over all variables except those contained in X.

That means, If X1,X2,…,Xn are discrete random variables, then the marginal probability mass function should be

if X1,X2,…,Xn are continuous random variables, then the marginal probability density function should be

See also
 Compound probability distribution
 Joint probability distribution
 Marginal likelihood
 Wasserstein metric
 Conditional distribution

References

Bibliography
 

Theory of probability distributions